A financial security system finances unknown future obligations. Such a system involves an arrangement between a provider, who agrees to pay the future obligations, often in return for payments from a person or institution who wish to avoid undesirable economic consequences of uncertain future obligations. Financial security systems include insurance products as well as retirement plans and warranties.

References

Actuarial science